American Beauty is the seventh novel in the A-List series by Zoey Dean. It was released in 2006 through Megan Tingley Publishers.

Plot summary
It is graduation time for the A-List crew. That means lavish yacht parties, designer caps and gowns, and saying bye-bye to high school for good. Despite the festivities, Anna is not in a partying mood. Ben has been acting distant and she is worried. Maybe her father's hot tattooed intern, Caine Manning, will help cheer Anna up! Ever since her illicit kiss with Parker, Sam has been Eduardo-less and heartbroken. But hopefully Sam will use her brains and considerable means to get creative about winning Eduardo back. And infamous Cammie? She could not care less about graduation, not when she is so close to unraveling the mystery of her mother's death. She will stop at nothing to find out the truth.

The book starts out with Anna driving to Sam's pre-graduation party on her father's new yacht. While talking to Cyn, her best friend from New York, she stops to let a couple cross the street, and a woman hits the back of her car.

References

2006 American novels
American young adult novels
Little, Brown and Company books